Euhadra senckenbergiana is a species of air-breathing land snail, a terrestrial pulmonate gastropod mollusk in the family Bradybaenidae. This species is found in Japan.

The shell of this species is dextral.

Subspecies 
A number of subspecies have been named:
 Euhadra senckenbergiana aomoriensis (Gulick & Pilsbry, 1900)
 Euhadra senckenbergiana ibukicola
 Euhadra senckenbergiana minoensis
 Euhadra senckenbergiana notoensis
 Euhadra senckenbergiana senckenbergiana

Comparison of the shells of the subspecies:

References

senckenbergiana
Gastropods described in 1875